Sunday Patrick Okoro (born 27 April 1986 in Abuja) is a Nigerian footballer playing with Dhivehi Premier League side New Radiant S.C.

Career 
Okoro previously played  professionally for Serbian club FK Radnički Pirot, Belgian clubs KSK Beveren and Germinal Beerschot and semi professionally for Nigeria side Shooting Stars, Faroes clubs B36 Tórshavn and B71 Sandoy. He also played amateur football for HSV Hoek.  He played with SC 84 Mettinghausen in the season 2012–13.  He afterwards moved to Asia where he played with Iraqi Premier League side Al-Quwa Al-Jawiya in 2013, and also Iraqi club, Al-Thawra, in 2013–14. In summer 2014 he joined New Radiant S.C. top-flight side from the Maldives.

References 

Living people
1986 births
Nigerian footballers
Nigerian expatriate footballers
Beerschot A.C. players
HSV Hoek players
Belgian Pro League players
Expatriate footballers in Belgium
Expatriate footballers in the Netherlands
B36 Tórshavn players
B71 Sandoy players
Expatriate footballers in the Faroe Islands
FK Radnički Pirot players
Serbian First League players
Expatriate footballers in Serbia
Expatriate footballers in Iraq
Expatriate footballers in the Maldives
Association football forwards
People from Abuja